Carlos Manuel de Céspedes, also shortened as Céspedes, is a town and municipality in the Camagüey Province of Cuba. It was named for the independence fighter Carlos Manuel de Céspedes (1819-1874).

Geography
It is located in the western part of the province, along the Carretera Central highway. The municipality is bordered by Florida, Esmeralda, Primero de Enero and Baraguá (both in Ciego de Ávila Province). The municipality includes some villages, such as Magarabomba.

Demographics
In 2004, the municipality of Carlos M. de Cespedes had a population of 25,707.

Transport
Céspedes is crossed by the Carretera Central highway and counts a railway station on the Havana-Santiago de Cuba line. A planned extension of the A1 motorway that will span the entire island will intersect the town.

See also
Carlos Manuel de Céspedes Municipal Museum
List of cities in Cuba
Municipalities of Cuba

References

External links

 Carlos Manuel de Céspedes on EcuRed

Populated places in Camagüey Province